Warsop is a town and civil parish in the Mansfield district, Nottinghamshire, England, on the outskirts of the remnants of Sherwood Forest. At the 2001 census it had a population of 12,365, reducing to 11,999 at the 2011 Census including Church Warsop, Meden Vale, Sookholme and Spion Kop

Governance
The parish was an urban district in Nottinghamshire until 1974, when it joined with Mansfield Borough and Woodhouse Urban District Council to form Mansfield District Council. Warsop retains a council, as a successor parish, including the localities of Market Warsop, Church Warsop, Meden Vale, Warsop Vale and Spion Kop. The council is based at Warsop Town Hall.

After re-alignment of local wards within Mansfield District Council before the 2011 local elections to achieve a standard format of one councillor-per-ward, Warsop has four designated areas named as Warsop Carrs, Netherfield, Market Warsop and Meden.

Warsop is a part of the Mansfield Parliamentary Constituency since 2010, whose MP since 2017 is Ben Bradley.

Communities 
The parish contains a number of historic settlements:

 Market Warsop, the largest area at the centre, south of the River Meden
 Church Warsop, north of the Meden
 Sookholme, to the west of the parish
 Nettleworth Manor, in the south west 
 Gleadthorpe Grange to the far north east.

Nearby villages built to support local mining activities in the 20th century were:
 Meden Vale, in the north east
 Warsop Vale to the north west.
 Spion Kop in the south of the parish sited along a short stretch of the A60 road was expanded from a rural base.

Landmarks
Warsop watermill was built in 1767.

Warsop windmill, first called Forest Mill but also later known as Bradmer Mill, was a stone-built tower erected in 1825. It was 28 feet high with three storeys, a fourth storey being added later in brick. The mill had four sails, two of which were blown down by a gale in 1910, after which the mill was worked for a short time on the two remaining sails. By the 1920s the mill had lost all its sails and its cap. The tower is a Grade II listed building, standing to the southeast of Warsop close to the A6075.

In 1930, Samuel Fell Wilson, a Warsop grocer, wine merchant, and publisher of the Warsop and District Almanack, was shot in the head and chest as he sat in his car outside the mill.

Warsop Town Hall was completed in 1933.

Education
Warsop is home to Meden School on Burns Lane, part of a local group named Torch Academy Gateway Trust. Former pupils include television hosts Pollyanna Woodward and Simon Mapletoft, Mansfield 103.2 presenter Jason Harrison, Breakfast Show host Joe Sentance on Rother FM/Dearne FM, ex-Everton footballer Neil Pointon, former England wicketkeeper Bruce French and his nephew, and current England and Nottinghamshire fast bowler Jake Ball.

Transport
Warsop railway station operated between 1897 and 1955. There is some ambition for eventual reopening of the line currently freight only between Shirebrook and Warsop.

Stagecoach bus 12 runs twice an hour between Shirebrook, Warsop and Mansfield. Stagecoach bus 11 also runs twice an hour between Meden Vale, Warsop and Mansfield, giving Warsop a bus service into Mansfield every 15 minutes. Another bus, numbered 209, runs between Edwinstowe and Worksop via Warsop and Cuckney every two hours.

In the news
In July 2012, local woman Charlotte Collinge was found guilty of the murder of her husband Clifford Collinge and was sentenced to 23 years. Her two male accomplices were both sentenced to 18 years.

Following a re-trial in July 2015, Collinge was found not guilty, but the sentences on both accomplices were re-imposed.

Local events
The parish holds an annual carnival on The Carrs playing fields, just off the main A60 road: it is traditionally scheduled on the first or second Sunday in July.

References

External links 
Warsop Parish Council homepage
Warsop area Community page

Towns in Nottinghamshire
Civil parishes in Nottinghamshire
Mansfield District